The Jégvirág Cup is a figure skating competition which is generally held in February in Miskolc, Hungary. Medals are awarded in men's singles, ladies singles, and ice dancing.

Senior medalists

Men

Ladies

Ice dancing

Junior medalists

Junior men

Junior ladies

Junior ice dancing

References 

Figure skating competitions
International figure skating competitions hosted by Hungary